New Riders may refer to:

 New Riders of the Purple Sage, an American country rock band formed in 1969
 New Riders (album), a 1976 album by the New Riders of the Purple Sage
 New Riders Press, a publishing imprint of Peachpit